This is a list of electoral results for the Boronia Province in Victorian state elections.

Members for Boronia Province

Election results

Elections in the 1980s

Elections in the 1970s

 Two party preferred vote was estimated.

Elections in the 1960s

 Two party preferred vote was estimated.

References

Victoria (Australia) state electoral results by district